Mait Püümets (born  Mait Johannes Püümann; 11 July 1882 Peningi Parish, Harju County – 23 January 1965 Tallinn) was an Estonian politician. He was a member of Estonian Constituent Assembly.

References

1882 births
1965 deaths
Estonian diplomats
Members of the Estonian Constituent Assembly
Members of the Riigikogu, 1920–1923
Estonian Social Democratic Workers' Party politicians
Estonian military personnel of the Estonian War of Independence
University of Tartu alumni
People from Raasiku Parish
Burials at Metsakalmistu